Veolia Environnement
 Veolia Transport
 Veolia Transport NSW, now Transdev NSW in Australia
 Veolia Transport Perth, now Transdev WA in Australia
 Veolia Transport Queensland, now Transdev Queensland in Australia
 Veolia Transport Brisbane, now Transdev Brisbane Ferries in Australia
 Veolia Transport Norge, now Boreal Norge in Norway
 Veolia Transport Cymru, later Crossgates Coaches in Wales
 Veolia Verkehr, now Transdev Germany in Germany, Verkehr ~ transport in German
 Veolia Transport Auckland, now Transdev Auckland in New Zealand
 Veolia Cargo, sold to Eurotunnel
 Veolia Transport Nederland, in the Netherlands
 Veolia Transdev, now Transdev
 Veolia Water
 Veolia Water UK
 Veolia Water Central
 Veolia Water Southeast
 Veolia Water East